Cork East is a parliamentary constituency in County Cork represented in Dáil Éireann, the lower house of the Irish parliament or Oireachtas. The constituency elects 4 deputies (Teachtaí Dála, commonly known as TDs) on the system of proportional representation by means of the single transferable vote (PR-STV).

History and boundaries
The constituency was first created in 1923 under the Electoral Act 1923 as a 4-seat constituency and was first used for the 1923 general election. It was abolished under the Electoral (Revision of Constituencies) Act 1935. It was recreated under the Electoral (Amendment) Act 1947 as a 3-seat constituency and used for the 1948 general election until it was abolished under the Electoral (Amendment) Act 1961. It was recreated under the Electoral (Amendment) Act 1980 as a 4-seat constituency for the 1981 general election, and has been used at all elections since then.

The constituency runs from Mitchelstown and Mallow in the north of County Cork, through Fermoy, to Cobh, Midleton and Youghal in the south.

The Electoral (Amendment) (Dáil Constituencies) Act 2017 defines the constituency as:

TDs

TDs 1923–1937

TDs 1948–1961

TDs since 1981

Elections

2020 general election

2016 general election

2011 general election

2007 general election

2002 general election

1997 general election

1992 general election

1989 general election

1987 general election

November 1982 general election

February 1982 general election

1981 general election

1957 general election

1954 general election

1953 by-election
Following the death of Labour Party TD Seán Keane, a by-election was held on 18 June 1953. The seat was won by the Fine Gael candidate Richard Barry.

1951 general election

1948 general election

1933 general election

1932 general election

September 1927 general election

June 1927 general election

1924 by-election
Following the death of Cumann na nGaedheal TD Thomas O'Mahony, a by-election was held on 18 November 1924. The seat was won by the Cumann na nGaedheal candidate Michael K. Noonan.

1923 general election

See also
Dáil constituencies
Elections in the Republic of Ireland
Politics of the Republic of Ireland
List of Dáil by-elections
List of political parties in the Republic of Ireland

References

External links
Oireachtas Constituency Dashboards
Oireachtas Members Database

Dáil constituencies
Politics of County Cork
1923 establishments in Ireland
1937 disestablishments in Ireland
Constituencies established in 1923
Constituencies disestablished in 1937
1948 establishments in Ireland
1961 disestablishments in Ireland
Constituencies established in 1948
Constituencies disestablished in 1961
1981 establishments in Ireland
Constituencies established in 1981